Pain Hular (also Romanized as Pā’īn Hūlār; also known as Hūlār-e Pā’īn) is a city in Kolijan Rostaq-e Olya Rural District, Kolijan Rostaq District, Sari County, Mazandaran Province, Iran. At the 2006 census, its population was 479, in 121 families.

References 

Populated places in Sari County
Cities in Mazandaran Province